Menthyl acetate is a natural monoterpene which contributes to the smell and flavor of peppermint.  It is the acetate ester of menthol.  Menthyl acetate constitutes 3–5% of the volatile oil of mentha piperita, contributing to its smell and flavour.

References

Monoterpenes
Acetate esters